Jupille or Jupille-sur-Meuse is a district of the city of Liège, Wallonia, located in the province of Liège, Belgium.

It was a municipality until 1977.

Jupille is the location of the brewery Piedbœuf (InBev group), where Jupiler is made.  It is also the death place of Pepin of Herstal. It has also been proposed as the birthplace of Pepin the Short, king of Franks (751-768) and perhaps even of his son Charlemagne, Emperor and king of the Franks, but there is no sure proof for these suppositions.

Notable people
 

Joseph Moutschen (1895–1977), Belgian architect

References

Sub-municipalities of Liège
Former municipalities of Liège Province